Elections in the Republic of India in 1971 included the 1971 Indian general election, elections to three state legislative assemblies and to seats in the Rajya Sabha.

General Election

Legislative Assembly elections

Orissa

Tamil Nadu

Source: ECI

West Bengal

References

External links

 

1971 elections in India
India
1971 in India
Elections in India by year